The Italy women's national artistic gymnastics team represents Italy in FIG international competitions.

History
Italy has participated in the Olympic Games women's team competition 13 times. It has won one medal, a silver in 1928. The team has also won two medals at the World Artistic Gymnastics Championships, a bronze in both 1950 and 2019. They won the team gold at the 2006 European Women's Artistic Gymnastics Championships.

Senior roster

Olympic Games results
 1928 —  silver medal
Bianca Ambrosetti, Lavinia Gianoni, Luigina Giavotti, Virginia Giorgi, Germana Malabarba, Clara Marangoni, Luigina Perversi, Diana Pizzavini, Luisa Tanzini, Carolina Tronconi, Ines Vercesi, Rita Vittadini
 1936 — 7th place
Anna Avanzini, Vittoria Avanzini, Clara Bimbocci, Ebore Canella, Pina Cipriotto, Elda Cividino, Gianna Guaita, Carmela Toso
 1948 — 8th place
Renata Bianchi, Norma Icardi, Licia Macchini, Laura Micheli, Wanda Nuti, Luciana Pezzoni, Elena Santoni, Lilia Torriani
 1952 — 6th place
Renata Bianchi, Grazia Bozzo, Miranda Cicognani, Elisabetta Durelli, Licia Macchini, Lidia Pitteri, Luciana Reali, Liliana Scaricabarozzi
 1956 — 7th place
Elisa Calsi, Miranda Cicognani, Rosella Cicognani, Elena Lagorara, Luciana Lagorara, Luciana Reali
 1960 — 10th place
Miranda Cicognani, Rosella Cicognani, Francesca Costa, Elena Lagorara, Gabriella Santarelli, Wanda Soprani
 1964 — did not participate

 1968 — did not participate in team competition
Individual competitors: Adriana Biagiotti, Daniela Maccelli, Gabriella Pozzuolo
 1972 — 12th place
Angela Alberti, Cinzia Delisi, Maria Grazia Mancuso, Gabriella Marchi, Rita Peri, Monica Stefani
 1976 — 12th place
Stefania Bucci, Patrizia Fratini, Rita Peri, Donatella Sacchi, Valentina Spongia, Carla Wieser
 1980 — did not participate

 1984 — did not participate in team competition
Individual competitor: Laura Bortolaso
 1988 — did not participate in team competition
Individual competitors: Maria Cocuzza, Patrizia Luconi, Giulia Volpi
 1992 — did not participate in team competition
Individual competitors: Veronica Servente, Giulia Volpi
 1996 — did not participate in team competition
Individual competitors: Francesca Morotti, Giordana Rocchi
 2000 — 11th place
Monica Bergamelli, Martina Bremini, Alice Capitani, Irene Castelli, Adriana Crisci, Laura Trefiletti
 2004 — did not participate in team competition
Individual competitors: Monica Bergamelli, Maria Teresa Gargano
 2008 — 10th place
Francesca Benolli, Monica Bergamelli, Vanessa Ferrari, Carlotta Giovannini, Federica Macrì, Lia Parolari
 2012 — 7th place
Giorgia Campana, Erika Fasana, Carlotta Ferlito, Vanessa Ferrari, Elisabetta Preziosa
 2016 — 10th place
Erika Fasana, Carlotta Ferlito, Vanessa Ferrari, Elisa Meneghini, Martina Rizzelli
 2020 — 4th place
Alice D'Amato, Asia D'Amato, Vanessa Ferrari, Martina Maggio
Individual competitor: Lara Mori

World Championships results 

 1950 —  bronze medal
Renata Bianchi, Licia Macchini, Laura Micheli, Anna Monlarini, Marja Nutti, Elena Santoni, Liliana Scaricabarozzi, Lilia Torriani
 1954 — 5th place
Elisa Calsi, Miranda Cicognani, Luciana Lagorara, Licia Macchini, Luciana Reali, Gabriella Santarelli, Liliana Scaricabarozzi, Maria Storici
 1970 — did not participate
 1974 — 13th place
Carmen Basla, Stefania Bucci, Serenella Codato, Cinzia Delisi, Gabriella Marchi, Rita Peri
 1978 — 14th place
Loana Biffi, Marinella Giorgini, Donatella Grossi, Caterina Miglioranza, Monica Valentini
 1979 — 27th place
Laura Bortolaso, Cristina Brambati, Elisabetta Grassi, Donatella Grossi, Caterina Miglioranza, Paola Pasteris
 1981 — did not participate
 1983 — 15th place
Laura Bortolaso, Anna di Mattia, Gianpiera Gambaro, Elena Ghiselli, Leonilde Iannuzzi, Josella Lombardi
 1985 — 14th place
Cristina Casubolo, Elena Ghiselli, Patrizia Luconi, Michela Pistacchi, Rossana Venegoni, Giulia Volpi
 1987 — 14th place
Maria Cocuzza, Patrizia Luconi, Barbara Righetto, Rossana Venegoni, Giulia Volpi, Floriana Zanetti
 1989 — 14th place
Selene Celotto, Lara Filippi, Roberta Kirchmayer, Elena Marcelloni, Alessandra Vietti, Giulia Volpi
 1991 — 15th place
Stefania Copelli, Carmen Falzarano, Chiara Ferrazzi, Valentina Rubinetti, Daniela Vairo, Giulia Volpi
 1994 (team) — did not participate
 1995 — 14th place
Individual competitors: Ilenia Meneghesso, Tania Rebagliati
 1997 — 15th place
Elisa Lamperti, Ilenia Meneghesso, Francesca Morotti, Tania Rebagliati, Paola Rivi, Giordana Rocchi
 1999 — 9th place
Individual competitors: Monica Bergamelli, Ilaria Colombo, Maria Teresa Gargano
 2003 — 15th place
Monica Bergamelli, Ilaria Colombo, Cristina Cavalli, Maria Teresa Gargano, Marika Pestrin, Ilaria Rosso
 2006 — 9th place
Monica Bergamelli, Sara Bradaschia, Lorena Coza, Vanessa Ferrari, Carlotta Giovannini, Federica Macrì
 2007 — 4th place
Francesca Benolli, Monica Bergamelli, Vanessa Ferrari, Federica Macrì, Lia Parolari, Silvia Zanolo 
 2010 — 8th place
Vanessa Ferrari, Serena Licchetta, Jessica Mattoni, Lia Parolari, Elisabetta Preziosa, Eleonora Rando 
 2011 — 9th place
Emily Armi, Giorgia Campana, Carlotta Ferlito, Chiara Gandolfi, Vanessa Ferrari, Elisabetta Preziosa
 2014 — 5th place
Giorgia Campana, Erika Fasana, Vanessa Ferrari, Lavinia Marongiu, Lara Mori, Martina Rizzelli
 2015 — 7th place
Erika Fasana, Vanessa Ferrari,* Carlotta Ferlito, Enus Mariani,* Elisa Meneghini, Lara Mori, Tea Ugrin  * Ferrari competed in the qualifications round but subsequently withdrew with an injury. Mariani replaced her for the team final.
 2018 — 12th place
Martina Basile, Irene Lanza, Lara Mori, Sara Ricciardi, Martina Rizzelli
 2019 —  bronze medal
Desiree Carofiglio, Alice D'Amato, Asia D'Amato, Elisa Iorio, Giorgia Villa, Martina Maggio
 2022 – 5th place
Alice D'Amato, Manila Esposito, Martina Maggio, Veronica Mandriota, Giorgia Villa, ''Elisa Iorio

Most decorated gymnasts
This list includes all Italian female artistic gymnasts who have won a medal at the Olympic Games or the World Artistic Gymnastics Championships.

Best international results

See also 
List of Olympic female artistic gymnasts for Italy

References

Gymnastics in Italy
National women's artistic gymnastics teams
Gymnastics